The term Bosniaks may refer to:
 Bosniaks, a South Slavic ethnic group
 Bosniaks (Croats in Hungary), a distinctive term for a group of ethnic Croats who migrated to Hungary from Bosnia

See also
 Bosniak (disambiguation)
 Bosnian (disambiguation)
 Bosnians (disambiguation)
 Bosnia (disambiguation)
 Name of Bosnia